Amy Jordan may refer to:

 Amy B. Jordan (astronomer), American astronomer
 Amy B. Jordan (media investigator) (born 1961), professor of journalism and media studies

See also
 Amy and Jordan, comic book